Harry Allwright (1837 – 18 July 1892) was a 19th-century Member of Parliament in Canterbury, New Zealand. A painter and glazier by trade, he came out with his parents and siblings in the Cressy in 1850, one of the First Four Ships. He took over his father's company in 1859 and became involved in local politics. He first became Mayor of Lyttelton in 1870 and was re-elected seven times. In the 1879 New Zealand general election, he defeated the incumbent and represented the Lyttelton electorate for three parliamentary terms until his own defeat in 1887. He died in 1892 and was survived by his wife; there were no children.

Early life
Allwright was born in 1837. He arrived in Lyttelton on the Cressy on 27 December 1850 with his parents, a brother, and some sisters. He was thus one of the Canterbury Pilgrims. He worked for his father, who was a painter and glazier. Upon his father Henry's death in 1859, he took over the business. When he was elected to parliament, his brother took over the business.

Allwright was a prominent sportsman and the president of the yacht club. He was an accomplished singer and regularly performed as a soloist with the Lyttelton Choral Union.

On 27 April 1866, Allwright married Matilda Lyons at the Wesleyan Chapel at Lyttelton. His wife, a widow, was also from Lyttelton and had also arrived in New Zealand on the Cressy.

Political career

He stood for the Lyttelton municipal council in January 1867 and was one of six candidates for four positions, but he came last. In January 1868, he was one of eleven or twelve (sources differ) candidates for seven available positions on the municipal council, and with the second highest number of votes he was declared elected. His term came to an end in September 1869 and of eight candidates for six positions, he came second. On 24/25 October 1870, the Lyttelton Fire destroyed two blocks along Norwich Quay, raising two-thirds of the town. The mayor, John S. Willcox, lost his building and company and thus did not have the time to remain mayor. At the 7 November council meeting, councillor Allwright was unanimously voted for as the new mayor and re-elected at the 21 December council meeting for the coming year. Allwright was Mayor of Lyttelton for seven years (1871, 1872, 1878–1882, 1887). He was a proponent for the Lyttelton Borough Council to build civic offices and the foundation stone for the Lyttelton Borough Council Chambers was laid in January 1887, just after Allwright's final election as mayor; his name was thus inscribed in the foundation stone: "H. Allwright, Mayor, 1887"

In 1879, he successfully contested the  Lyttelton electorate against the incumbent Hugh Murray-Aynsley. He represented Lyttelton until 1887 when he was defeated by John Joyce.

Death
He died on 18 July 1892 at 277 Armagh Street, Christchurch Central City, after having been ill for several months, aged 55. He was survived by his wife; they had no children. His wife died in 1906.

References

New Zealand MPs for Christchurch electorates
Members of the New Zealand House of Representatives
1830s births
1892 deaths
Canterbury Pilgrims
Unsuccessful candidates in the 1887 New Zealand general election
19th-century New Zealand politicians
Lyttelton Harbour Board members
Mayors of places in Canterbury, New Zealand